is a former Japanese football player.

Club career
Ikeda was born in Shizuoka on April 27, 1981. He joined the Shimizu S-Pulse youth team in 2000. At the 1999–2000 Asian Cup Winners' Cup, he scored a winning goal at the final and the club won the championship. Although he became a regular player in 2002, his did not play as much in 2004 and he moved to Sanfrecce Hiroshima in 2005. He moved to Vegalta Sendai in 2006 and JEF United Chiba in 2007. At JEF United, he played for four seasons. After that, he played for Ehime FC (2011) and FC Gifu (2012). He retired at the end of the 2012 season.

National team career
In June 2001, Ikeda was selected for the Japan U-20 national team for the 2001 World Youth Championship. At that tournament, he played all three matches.

Club statistics

References

External links

1981 births
Living people
Association football people from Shizuoka Prefecture
Japanese footballers
Japan youth international footballers
J1 League players
J2 League players
Shimizu S-Pulse players
Sanfrecce Hiroshima players
Vegalta Sendai players
JEF United Chiba players
Ehime FC players
FC Gifu players
Asian Games medalists in football
Footballers at the 2002 Asian Games
Asian Games silver medalists for Japan
Association football defenders
Medalists at the 2002 Asian Games